Arthur Edward Guinness, 1st Baron Ardilaun, 2nd Baronet (1 November 1840 – 20 January 1915), known as Sir Arthur Guinness, Bt, between 1868 and 1880, was an Irish businessman, politician, and philanthropist, best known for giving St Stephen's Green to the Dublin Corporation for public use.

Background and education
Guinness was born at St Anne's, Raheny, near Dublin, the eldest son of Sir Benjamin Guinness, 1st Baronet, and elder brother of Edward Guinness, 1st Earl of Iveagh. He was the great-grandson of Arthur Guinness. He was educated at Eton and Trinity College Dublin, and in 1868 succeeded his father as second Baronet.

Political life
In 1868 Guinness was elected Conservative Member of Parliament for the City of Dublin, a seat he held for only a year. His election was voided because of his election agent's unlawful efforts, which the court found were unknown to him. He was re-elected at the next election in 1874.

A supporter of Disraeli's "one nation" conservatism, his politics were typical of "constructive unionism", the belief that the union between Ireland and Britain should be more beneficial to the people of Ireland after centuries of difficulties. In 1872 he was a sponsor of the "Irish Exhibition" at Earlsfort Terrace in Dublin, which was arranged to promote Irish trade. Correcting a mistake about the exhibition in the Freeman's Journal led to a death threat from a religious extremist, which he did not report to the police. In the 1890s he supported the Irish Unionist Alliance.

After withdrawing from the Guinness company in 1876, when he sold his half-share to his brother Edward for £600,000, he was in 1880 raised to the peerage as Baron Ardilaun, of Ashford in the County of Galway. His home there was at Ashford Castle on Lough Corrib, and his title derived from the Gaelic Ard Oileáin, a 'high island' on the lake.

Landlord

In 1852, Sir Benjamin Lee Guinness, 1st Baronet (1798–1868), heir to the Guinness brewery fortune and father of Arthur Guinness, "acquired several Connacht estates that were up for sale in the Encumbered Estates' Court. He bought the Ashford estate from Lord Oranmore and Browne, the Doon estate from Sir Richard O'Donnell, the Cong estate from Alexander Lambert, part of the Rosshill estate from Lords Charlemont and Leitrim, parts of Connemara from Christopher St George. In 1859, he bought Kylemore from a banking consortium. With these purchases, Benjamin Guinness became landlord to 670 tenants, 316 of whom rented at less than £5 per annum. With his father’s death in 1868, Arthur Guinness, 2nd Baronet and oldest son and heir, continued in his father’s footsteps, purchasing vast swaths of Galway. "He bought the Elwood estate of Strandhill, just across the river from Ashford, Cong, in 1871, and Lord Kilmaine sold him the Inishdoorus islands on Lough Corrib, and lands in the barony of Ross, part of Nymphsfield near Cong in 1875. William Burke of Lisloughry was his agent". When Arthur's acquisitions were combined with those of his father, total acreage for the Ashford estate was 33,298 with the result that Lord Ardilaun owned most of County Galway between Maam (Maum) Bridge and Lough Mask.

Owning 33,000 acres recently bought by his father or himself in Counties Galway and Mayo, Ardilaun was placed in a difficult and unusual position during the Land War of the 1880s. Tenant farmers had started a rent strike against absentee landlords who cared little about their estates. In contrast, Ardilaun lived at Ashford for much of the year, and invested heavily in his lands, but was forced to sell land from the 1880s and saw two of his bailiffs killed in what became known as the Lough Mask Murders in January 1882. His attempt to preserve the landscape at Muckross, Killarney from 1899 for aesthetic reasons was under challenge as soon as 1905. With the Digby family he was a joint owner of the Aran Islands that were compulsorily purchased by the Congested Districts Board in 1916.

Philanthropy

Ardilaun was, like many in the Guinness family, a generous philanthropist, devoting himself to a number of public causes, including the restoration of Marsh's Library in Dublin and the extension of the city's Coombe Women's Hospital. In buying and keeping intact the estate around Muckross House in 1899, he assisted the movement to preserve the lake and mountain landscape around Killarney, now a major tourist destination. From 1875 he was a sponsor of the "Dublin Artizan's Dwellings Company", which built cottages for poor Dubliners at reasonable rents, and was the forerunner of the Iveagh Trust later set up by his brother Edward.

In his best-known achievement, he also bought, landscaped, and gave to the capital, the central public park of St Stephen's Green, where his statue commissioned by the city can be seen opposite the Royal College of Surgeons. To do so he sponsored a Private bill that was passed as the Saint Stephen’s Green (Dublin) Act 1877, and after the landscaping it was formally opened to the public on 27 July 1880. It has been maintained since then by the Commissioners of Public Works in Ireland (now the Office of Public Works)

In 1913 Ardilaun was approached by Sir Hugh Lane, who wanted to build a new modern art gallery in the Green where the statue of Lord Ardilaun was placed. Ardilaun replied:
"Are you mad? I will not have myself stand sentry to a picture palace like some giddy huckster".

An intermission in Ardilaun's philanthropy provoked Yeats's powerful poem "To a Wealthy Man...."

He was also elected President of the Royal Dublin Society from 1892 to 1913.

In "Ulysses"
Ulysses by James Joyce includes several references to Ardilaun, as Joyce considered him to be a prime Irish example of Victorian conventional respectability. The porter brewed by the "cunning brothers" – he and his brother Lord Iveagh – was:  "a crystal cup full of the foamy ebon ale which the noble twin brothers Bungiveagh and Bungardilaun brew ever in their divine alevats, cunning as the sons of deathless Leda. For they garner the succulent berries of the hop and mass and sift and bruise and brew them and they mix therewith sour juices and bring the must to the sacred fire and cease not night or day from their toil, those cunning brothers, lords of the vat." "Bung" referred to the stopper in a wooden barrel of beer. In the "Nighttown" section, the breasts of a girl who is undressing are "Two ardilauns", meaning "two high islands", a play on the Gaelic meaning of the word.

In 1902-03 Joyce also wrote literary reviews in the Irish Daily Express which was owned by Ardilaun.

Personal life

In 1871 Lord Ardilaun married Lady Olivia Hedges-White, daughter of The 3rd Earl of Bantry, whose family home is Bantry House in County Cork; this was a happy but childless marriage.

He died on 20 January 1915 at his home at St Anne's, Raheny, and was buried at All Saints Church, Raheny, whose construction he had sponsored. Those present at the funeral included representatives of the Royal Dublin Society, of which Lord Ardilaun was president for many years, the Royal Horticultural Society of Ireland, the Irish Unionist Alliance, and the Primrose League. His barony became extinct at his death, but the baronetcy devolved upon his nephew Algernon.

On his widow's death Saint Anne's Park passed to Algernon's cousin Rev. Benjamin Plunket former Bishop of Meath, who sold most of the estate to Dublin Corporation in 1937, keeping Sybil Hill as his residence. The corporation has preserved much of the estate as one of Dublin's most important public parks, though the house itself burnt down in 1943, with the remaining lands used for housing. The outcome of Ardilaun's extensive tree plantings came into focus a century after his death, when in 2019 the park was given Green Flag status, and was listed as one of the world's top five urban public parks.

Notes

References
Wilson, Derek. Dark and Light  Weidenfeld, London 1998. .
Saint Stephen's Green (Dublin) Act; enacted 1877

Ardilaun, Arthur Edward Guinness, 1st Baron
Ardilaun, Arthur Edward Guinness, 1st Baron
Ardilaun, Arthu
Ardilaun, Arthur Edward Guinness, 1st Baron
Guinness, Arthur Edward
People from Clontarf, Dublin
People from Raheny
Ardilaun, Arthur Edward Guinness, Baron
Ardilaun, Arthur Edward Guinness, Baron
Ardilaun, Arthur Edward Guinness, Baron
Guinness, Arthur Edward
Guinness, Arthur Edward
Guinness, Arthur Edward
UK MPs who were granted peerages
Ardilaun, Arthur Edward Guinness, 1st Baron
Ardilaun, Arthur Edward Guinness, 1st Baron
19th-century Irish businesspeople
20th-century Irish businesspeople
Irish landlords
19th-century Irish landowners
20th-century Irish landowners
Peers of the United Kingdom created by Queen Victoria